Lamberto Pignotti (born 1926 in Firenze) is an Italian poet, writer and visual artist.

Biography
In the early 1960s, he was one of the first artists who worked creating intersections between poetry, word and mass media, fixing theoretical basis and assembling traditions of avant-garde and Pop Art. Lamberto Pignotti, together with Eugenio Miccini, are considered to be one of the initiators of Italian visual poetry. He collaborated with national and international journals, with television programs of Rai. He was professor in the Faculty of Architecture of the University of Florence and in DAMS of Bologna, where he hold courses on avant-garde, mass-media, and new media.
Theoretician and artist using synesthesia in the arts, he creates performances and poetry events where are present linguistic, verbal, and gesture signs, involving the five senses.
We have performance actions with poems to eat, to drink, to hear, to sniff, to put in action with gestures and voice.
His visual poems are realized as collage elaborations with writing on images and photography taken from the world of mass media, with the aim to make evident its contradictions in a ludic process similar to the one of Pop Art.
Lamberto Pignotti has realized object-books with various materials, performance using text fragments variously combined, also involving the public.
His work has been presented in many countries and is included also in didactical books in Italy, such as
Storia dell'arte Italiana di Electa-Bruno Mondadori.
The most relevant Italian art critics were interested in Lamberto Pignotti's work, among them: Gillo Dorfles, Giulio Carlo Argan, Umberto Eco, Achille Bonito Oliva.
In the 1990s, he began to get involved in the art network on line, participating with his visual poems and performances in several events in the Internet in the context of new media art meetings and art databases.

Exhibitions
Among the exhibitions:
Biennale di Venezia, Quadriennale di Roma, the avant-garde festival of New York, São Paulo Biennial.

Bibliography
Among his numerous publications:
Lamberto Pignotti, Sine æsthetica, sinestetica. Poesia visiva e arte plurisensoriale, Roma, Empiria, 1990
 Lamberto Pignotti, Nozione di uomo, Milano, Mondadori, 1964
 Lamberto Pignotti, Una forma di lotta, Milano, Mondadori, 1967
 Lamberto Pignotti, Parola per parola, diversamente, Venezia, Marsilio, 1976
 Lamberto Pignotti, Vedute, Roma, Edizioni Florida, 1982
 Lamberto Pignotti, Questa storia o un’altra, Napoli, Guida, 1984
 Lamberto Pignotti, In principio, with presentation essays by Marcello Carlino, Francesco Muzzioli, Giorgio Patrizi, Cosenza, UH scrittura & poesia, 1986
 Lamberto Pignotti, Zone marginali, Pasian di Prato (UD), Campanotto, 1991
 Lamberto Pignotti, Odissea, Roma, Fermenti, 1994.
 Lamberto Pignotti, Le nudità provocanti, Bologna, Sampietro, 1965
 Lamberto Pignotti, Giro del mondo, Napoli, Medusa, 1987
 Lamberto Pignotti, Tutte le direzioni, Roma, Empiria, 1988
AAVV, Lamberto Pignotti, Firenze, Edizioni META, 1999
Lamberto Pignotti, Scritture convergenti. Letteratura e mass media, Pasian di Prato-UD, Campanotto Editore, 2005

External links
Interview (it)
   Visual works on line
  MART Rovereto

See also
Poetry
Visual Poetry
Digital Poetry
Concrete Poetry
Performance
Fluxus
Futurism
Gruppo 63
Avant-garde

External links 

 Lamberto Pignotti Papers. General Collection, Beinecke Rare Book and Manuscript Library, Yale University.

Italian poets
Italian male poets
Italian multimedia artists
Italian contemporary artists
Artists from Florence
Gruppo 63
Living people
1926 births
Academic staff of the University of Florence
Visual poets